Peter Crolla is a British Formula One engineer. He is currently the trackside operations manager at the Haas Formula One team.

Career
Crolla started his career in motorsport in 2004 as a data engineer for Team Dynamics which was competing in the British Touring Car Championship. After one year with the team he moved to Fortec Motorsport which competed in British Formula 3 International Series where he was a race engineer for two years and then became team manager from 2007 to 2010. In 2011 he returned to Team Dynamics as team manager. He stayed there for three years, until Crolla joined McLaren Racing as garage team leader. Seeking a new challenge, Crolla joined the fledging Haas team as race team co-ordinator and the team's 14th employee. He became team manager in September 2017 and is now the race team operations manager overseeing garage operations as well as sporting governance and liasing sporting matters with Michael Masi and the FIA.

References

Living people
British motorsport people
Formula One engineers
Year of birth missing (living people)